William Morgan (birth unknown – death unknown) was a Welsh rugby union and professional rugby league footballer who played in the 1920s and 1930s.

Background
Bill Morgan was born in Ebbw Vale, Wales.

Playing career

International honours
Bill Morgan played right-, i.e. number 10, in Wales' (RL) 2–19 defeat by England at The Willows, Salford on Wednesday 27 January 1932.

Notable tour matches
Bill Morgan played right-, i.e. number 10, in Wigan's 4–10 defeat by Australia at Central Park, Wigan, on Saturday 23 September 1933.

Club career
Bill Morgan played in Newport RFC's 3–20 defeat by New South Wales Waratahs during the 1927–28 Waratahs tour of the British Isles, France and Canada at Rodney Parade, Newport, Wales on Thursday 22 September 1927. Bill Morgan made his début for Wigan and scored a try in the 51–5 victory over Rochdale Hornets at Central Park, Wigan on Thursday 25 December 1930, scored his last try for Wigan in the 45–5 victory over Wakefield Trinity at Central Park, Wigan on Monday 2 January 1933, and he played his last match for Wigan in the 6–7 defeat by Broughton Rangers at Belle Vue Stadium, Belle Vue, Manchester on Saturday 28 October 1933.

Genealogical information
Bill Morgan was the father of the rugby union and rugby league footballer; Ronald Morgan.

References

External links
Statistics at blackandambers.co.uk

Newport RFC players
Rugby league players from Ebbw Vale
Rugby league props
Rugby union forwards
Rugby union players from Ebbw Vale
Wales national rugby league team players
Welsh rugby league players
Welsh rugby union players
Wigan Warriors players
Year of birth missing
Year of death missing